The Donehoo-Brannen House (also known as the Donehoo-Brannen-Nesmith House) is a historic house located at 332 Savannah Avenue in Statesboro, Georgia.

Description and history 
The Classical Revival style house was completed in 1917 and was designed by the Georgia-born American architect Edward Columbus Hosford, who is noted for the courthouses and other buildings that he designed in Florida, Georgia and Texas. He designed the 1914 renovations to the historic Bulloch County Courthouse in Statesboro.

On July 7, 1995, the house was added to the National Register of Historic Places. It is also part of the Savannah Avenue Historic District (NRHP #96001339).

See also
 National Register of Historic Places listings in Bulloch County, Georgia

References

External links 

 

Edward Columbus Hosford buildings
Houses on the National Register of Historic Places in Georgia (U.S. state)
Houses in Bulloch County, Georgia
Neoclassical architecture in Georgia (U.S. state)
National Register of Historic Places in Bulloch County, Georgia
Houses completed in 1917